
Dmanisi (Dmanisis munitsip’alit’et’i) is a municipality in Georgia's southern region of Kvemo Kartli, covering an area of . As of 2021 it had a population of 20,922 people. The city of Dmanisi is its administrative centre.

Administrative divisions
Dmanisi municipality is administratively divided into 15 communities (თემი, temi) with 57 villages (სოფელი, sopeli) and one city (Dmanisi).

Population
The population of Dmanisi Municipality is 20,922 according to the 2021 estimate, which is a slight increase from the last census of 2014 (19,141). The ethnic composition is 31.2% Georgian, 65.5% Azerbaijani. The population density is 17.5 people per square kilometer.

Politics
Dmanisi Municipal Assembly (Georgian: დმანისის საკრებულო, Dmanisi Sakrebulo) is the representative body in Dmanisi Municipality, consisting of 30 members which are elected every four years. The last election was held in October 2021. Koba Muradashvili of Georgian Dream was elected mayor.

Gallery

See also 
 List of municipalities in Georgia (country)

References

External links 

 Website Municipality

Municipalities of Kvemo Kartli